The Highlands School District is a community public school district that serves students in pre-kindergarten through sixth grade in Highlands, in Monmouth County, New Jersey, United States. In the 2016–17 school year, Highlands was tied for the 40th-smallest enrollment of any school district in the state, with 190 students.

As of the 2018–19 school year, the district, comprising one school, had an enrollment of 192 students and 22.8 classroom teachers (on an FTE basis), for a student–teacher ratio of 8.4:1.

The district is classified by the New Jersey Department of Education as being in District Factor Group "CD", the sixth-highest of eight groupings. District Factor Groups organize districts statewide to allow comparison by common socioeconomic characteristics of the local districts. From lowest socioeconomic status to highest, the categories are A, B, CD, DE, FG, GH, I and J.

For seventh through twelfth grades, public school students attend Henry Hudson Regional High School, a comprehensive six-year high school and regional public school district that serves students from both Atlantic Highlands and Highlands. As of the 2018–19 school year, the high school had an enrollment of 331 students and 39.1 classroom teachers (on an FTE basis), for a student–teacher ratio of 8.5:1.

School
Highlands Elementary School had an enrollment of 189 students in the 2018–19 school year.
Daniel Layton

Administration
Core members of the district's administration are:
Dr. Susan E. Compton, Tri-District Superintendent
Christopher Mullins, Business Administrator / Board Secretary

Compton serves jointly as Tri-District Superintendent of Schools for the Atlantic Highlands School District, the Highlands School District and the Henry Hudson Regional High School.

Board of education
The district's board of education, with seven members, sets policy and oversees the fiscal and educational operation of the district through its administration. As a Type II school district, the board's trustees are elected directly by voters to serve three-year terms of office on a staggered basis, with either two or three seats up for election each year held (since 2012) as part of the November general election.

References

External links
Highlands School District
 
Data for Highlands School District, National Center for Education Statistics
Henry Hudson Regional High School
 
Data for Henry Hudson Regional High School, National Center for Education Statistics

Highlands, New Jersey
New Jersey District Factor Group CD
School districts in Monmouth County, New Jersey
Public elementary schools in New Jersey